The 2003 FIA Sportscar Championship Monza was the third race for the 2003 FIA Sportscar Championship season held at Autodromo Nazionale Monza and ran for 500 kilometers. It took place on June 29, 2003.

Official results
Class winners in bold.  Cars failing to complete 75% of winner's distance marked as Not Classified (NC).

Statistics
 Pole Position - #1 Racing for Holland - 1:41.581
 Fastest Lap - #1 Racing for Holland - 1:42.869
 Distance - 486.612 km
 Average Speed - 193.979 km/h

References

M
FIA Sportscar
6 Hours of Monza